WNMH is a high school radio station broadcasting a Variety format. The station is owned by Northfield Mount Hermon School. From 1984 until 2010, the station was licensed to operate on 91.5 FM from Northfield, Massachusetts, United States and featured programming from ABC Radio. From 2014 until 2017, Northfield Mount Hermon School held a construction permit for a low-power FM station, WNMH-LP (106.7 FM) in Mount Hermon (a section of Gill), which would have restored WNMH's programming to the FM dial. , WNMH continues to operate as an Internet radio station on wnmh.live.

History

The former WNMH (to 2010)

WNMH signed on September 10, 1984. The station's license at Northfield was cancelled by the Federal Communications Commission (FCC) on September 28, 2010 when the campus was sold.

WNMH-LP

The FCC granted a new construction permit on April 21, 2014, to broadcast FM from the NMH campus at Mount Hermon (in Gill, Massachusetts) from the studios in Crossley Hall. WNMH Radio has webcast its signal continuously over the years, beginning with Christmas Vespers in 2004. The construction permit expired on April 21, 2017; the FCC canceled the permit that day.

References

External links

NMH
High school radio stations in the United States
Internet radio stations in the United States
Defunct radio stations in the United States
NMH
Radio stations established in 1984
1984 establishments in Massachusetts
Radio stations disestablished in 2010
2010 disestablishments in Massachusetts
Northfield, Massachusetts